In the run up to the 2009 Portuguese local elections, various organisations carried out opinion polling to gauge voting intention in several municipalities across Portugal. Results of such polls are displayed in this article. The date range for these opinion polls are from the previous local elections, held on 9 October 2005, to the day the next elections were held, on 11 October 2009.

Polling

Alcobaça

Aveiro

Barcelos

Braga

Faro

Leiria

Lisbon

Lousada

Matosinhos

Oeiras

Oliveira do Bairro

Paços de Ferreira

Paredes

Penafiel

Porto

Santa Cruz

Setúbal

Trofa

Valongo

Viana do Castelo

Vila Nova de Gaia

Notes

External links 
 ERC - Official publication of polls
 Marktest Polls local elections 2005
 2009 local election results
 2005 local election results

Opinion polling in Portugal